Alfhild or Alvildam was a legendary Saxon princess mentioned in Gesta Danorum. Her suitors: the king of the Danes, Skiod and the governor of the Alamanni Skat fought for her hand, the former winning. Later she gave birth to a son.

The text

References

Legendary Norsemen